, in Nagoya, Aichi Prefecture, Japan, is a Japanese gravure idol, tarento, actress and former race queen. Her popularity as race queen opened the doors for singing and acting career.

In 2004, she portrayed Zero Suit Samus in the Japanese Metroid: Zero Mission Commercial. There are several shots fired at her back as she lets out a scream.

She contributed a "Play Diary" to the Metroid: Zero Mission Official Site, which was as strategy guide for the first part of Zero Mission and also contributed flyers and standees, both signed by her as speedrun contest.

In 2019, Morishita retired from the entertainment industry and in April 2021, was elected Chief of the 5th Election District Branch in the Miyagi Prefecture for Japan's Liberal Democratic Party

Filmography

TV Series

2002: Omiai Hourouki (NHK)
2002: Kamen Rider Ryuki as Megumi Asano
2010: Genya (WOWOW)
2011: Kamen Rider OOO (cameo)

TV Movies

2006: The School of Water Business (NTV)

Anime Films

2006: Bleach: Memories of Nobody

Movies

2003: The Locker
2003: Suicide Manual
2004: The Locker 2 as Yuna
2005: Mail
2005: Gurozuka as Ai
2006: Kamen Rider Kabuto: God Speed Love as Shura Hokuto
2007: Tsubaki Sanjuro
2009: Long Caravan
2009: Departed to the Future
2014: High Kick Angels as J Rose

References

External links
 
 
 ChiiChiiiii on Twitter
 morishitachii on Instagram

Japanese actresses
1981 births
Living people
People from Nagoya
Japanese television personalities